ROCK may refer to:
Chicago, Rock Island and Pacific Railroad
Rho-associated protein kinase, a serine/threonine-specific protein kinase
Rollergirls of Central Kentucky, roller derby league based in Lexington, Kentucky
R.O.C.K., a 1986 hard rock/heavy metal album by Kirka
 Robert Orin Charles Kilroy, from the Styx rock opera Kilroy Was Here, see Mr. Roboto

See also
Rock (disambiguation)
The Rock (disambiguation)
ROC (disambiguation)